Dünyayı Kurtaran Adam'ın Oğlu (literally The Son of the Man who Saved the World and regularly titled Turks in Space in English) is a 2006 Turkish science fiction action comedy film directed by Kartal Tibet and the sequel to Dünyayı Kurtaran Adam (The Man Who Saved the World). Actor/martial artist Cüneyt Arkın reprises his role.

Plot 
In the future of 2055, the world is in chaos and in need of a governmental system to form peace. A still-standing “Orion union” between all the states is all they have. The son of Murat from the first film works with his twin brother (who he does not know is his twin brother) in order to save the world.

Cast

 Cüneyt Arkın as Murat
 Haldun Boysan as Kazu
 Berda Ceyhan as BC13
 Veysel Diker as Doktor
 Mehmet Ali Erbil as Captain Kartal / Zaldabar, Murat's son
 Ali Erkazan as Kazanci cemal
 Didem Erol as Caroline
 Ayşen Gruda as Safiye Ana
 Egemen Gunes as Ozi
 Bayazit Gülercan as President Orion
 Burak Hakki as Gökmen
 Ismail Incekara as Dogibus
 Burcu Kara as Princess Maya
 Günay Karacaoğlu as Teorik Tugce
 Alp Kırşan as Spoth

Production 

There had long been the idea of a sequel after the predecessor was released. Following several failed attempts to get the cast back together, the project began production. In an interview they stated the sequel would not have much similarity to the original other than “animation similarities”

Reception

References

External links
 
 

2006 films
2000s Turkish-language films
2006 action comedy films
2000s science fiction comedy films
Turkish action films
Turkish comedy films
Turkish independent films
Turkish science fiction films
Space pirates
Space opera films
Films shot in Turkey
Turkish sequel films
Space adventure films
2000s parody films
Turkish films about revenge
Films set in 2055
2006 comedy films
Unofficial Star Wars films
Star Wars fandom
2000s American films